Diocese of Bujumbura may refer to the following ecclesiastical jurisdictions:
 Roman Catholic Diocese of Bujumbura (1964–2006), Burundi, now the Roman Catholic Archdiocese of Bujumbura
 Anglican Diocese of Bujumbura (f. 1975), Burundi